Thor-CD was a re-recordable CD format proposed in 1988 by Tandy.

Several years before recordable compact discs were introduced, Tandy Corporation announced a similar CD format named Thor-CD, but after being pushed back for several years, it was finally cancelled due to steep manufacturing costs.

At the time Tandy proposed the new format, CDs were mostly used for digital music, but not for other digital data. Tandy aimed to change this with its new format.

However, the introduction of the CD-ROM format, which was incompatible with Tandy's proposal, all but killed Tandy's product.

See also 
 Vaporware

References

Optical disc authoring
Vaporware